Acoustica may refer to:

Acoustica: Alarm Will Sound Performs Aphex Twin, a 2005 album by Alarm Will Sound
Acoustica (Scorpions album), a 2001 album by Scorpions
Acoustica (Wolfgang album), a 2000 album by Filipino rock band Wolfgang
Acoustica (Alex Lloyd album), a 2016 album by Australian singer-songwriter, Alex Lloyd
Acoustica, Inc., developer of Mixcraft Studio, an audio workstation, MIDI sequencer, and virtual instrument host
Acoustica (software), a digital audio editor

See also

 Acoustic (disambiguation)
 Acustica (disambiguation)